The Shanhai Yudi Quantu ("Complete Terrestrial Map") is a Ming dynasty Chinese map published in 1609 in the leishu encyclopedia Sancai Tuhui.

Influences 

The Shanhai Yudi Quantu is known to have been highly influenced by the Jesuit missions in China, starting with the work of Matteo Ricci. Matteo Ricci himself had two of his own maps entitled Shanhai Yudi Quantu: one engraved by Wu Zhongming (Wú Zhōngmíng) and dated 1600 and another engraved by Guo Zizhang (Gūo Zĭzhāng) and dated 1604.

Description

Asia
The Asian continent is marked phonetically 亞細亞 (Modern Pinyin Yàxìyà, Middle Chinese Aseja). This is the area of the map where most information can be found, and has been subdivided here by regions:

East Asia

Numerous areas and islands are named in this part of the world:
 The Great Ming Empire (Dà Míngguó)
 Japan (Rìběn)
 Goryeo Korea (Gāolì)
 The Jurchen Manchurians (Rǚzhí)
 "Five Cities" near Sungari (Wǔ Chéng)
 Liaodong (Liáodōng)
 Daning, a military region (Dà Níng)
 Tartary, north of Liaodong (Dádá)
 "Dogland", a land of dog-headed men in eastern Siberia (Gǒugúo)
 "Coral Tree Island" (Shānhúshù Dǎo)
 Ryukyu Islands (Liúqiú)
 Siberia (Běijíjiè, lit. "Arctic Region")

The seas beside East Asia are the South China Sea (lit. "Great Ming Sea") and the "Lesser Eastern Ocean" (Xiǎo Dōng Yáng). To the north is the "Ice Sea" (Bīng Hǎi).

West Asia
 Gobi Desert (lit. "The Sandy Wastes", which has become the Chinese word for "Desert")
 Kham Tibetans (Xī Fān, lit. "The Western Barbarians")
 Muslims (Huíhuí)
 Western Regions (Xīyù)
 Qinghai (Xīngsù Hǎi, lit. "Northern High Sea")
 The Kunlun Range (Kūnlún)

South Asia

 Annam in Vietnam (lit. "The Pacified South")
 Champa (Zhànchéng)
 Hainan (Hǎinán)
 Srivijaya (Modern Pinyin Sānfóqí, Middle Chinese Sambiutjay)
 India (Yīngdìyà)
 Western India (Xī Tiānzhú)

Two seas are shown: the Bay of Bengal (Pánggélà Hǎi) and "Lesser Western Ocean" (Xiǎo Xī Yáng).

Java is shown in two pieces  Major (Dà Zhǎowā) and Minor (Xiǎo Zhǎowā)  far into the "Southwest" and "Southern" Seas near the Antarctic.

Europe

 France (Fólǎngchá)
 "More than thirty countries" (sānshí yú gúo)
 Greenland (Wòlándìyà from Latin 'Groenlandia')

Europe is surrounded by the "Greater Western Ocean" (Dà Xī Yáng, a body of water formerly located east of Rome and conflated with the Indian Ocean but now appropriately placed in the Atlantic), the Mediterranean (Dìzhōng Hǎi), and the Black Sea (Tài Hǎi, lit. "Great Sea").

North America 
North America is marked as "" (Modern Pinyin Běi Yàmèilìjiā, Middle Chinese Pok Amoklika). The only location is marked phonetically and is unknown:

 "Angwayma" (Yàwàimā)

Another two unknown locations are on an island to America's northeast, possibly the inhabited southwest coast of Greenland:

 "Cold River" (Hán Hé)
 "Fragrant Peak" (Xiāngfēng)

The Gulf of California is marked as the "Eastern Red Sea" (Dōng Hóng Hǎi) and the "Ice Sea" continues across the north.

South America 
South America is marked as "" (Modern Pinyin Nán Yàmèilìjiā, Middle Chinese Nom Amoklika). 

 "Land of the Cannibals" (Shírén Guó)
 Rio de la Plata (Yín Hé)

Surrounding it are the Atlantic Ocean (marked as "Oceano" , Hézhéyànuò Cāng) to the northeast, the "Sea of Peru" (Bólù Hǎi) to the west, and the "Greater Eastern Ocean" (Dà Dōng Yáng).

Libya

Following classical geography, the continent of Africa is marked phonetically as "Libya" (Lìwèiyà).

Africa is surrounded by several seas. From the north, clockwise: the Mediterranean; the "Lesser Western Ocean" (Xiǎo Xī Yáng) in the Persian Gulf and Arabian Sea; the Red Sea, called the "Western Red Sea" (Xī Hóng Hǎi) to distinguish it from the Gulf of California); the western Indian Ocean, called the "Arabian Sea" (Modern Pinyin Yàlàpí Hǎi, Middle Chinese Alapbie Hoy); the Gulf of Guinea, called the "Libyan Sea" (Lìwèiyà Hǎi); and the Atlantic Ocean (again marked as "Oceano" , Hézhéyànuò Cāng).

Magallania
This transliterates the name "Magallanica", a name given to the prospective continent at the time in honor of Ferdinand Magellan, who had crossed past Tierra del Fuego and shown the southern continent (hypothesized since Ptolemy) to be separate from South America.

The map notes how little is known about this continent  "Few have reached these southern regions. Things are not explored yet"  but also includes more placenames in it than in Africa, America, or Europe:

 "White Peak" (Bái Fēng)
 "Great River" (Dà Jiāng)
 Tierra del Fuego (Huǒdì lit. "Place of Fire")
 Antarctica (Nánjíjiè, lit. "Antarctic Region")
 New Guinea (Xīn Rùnì)
 "Place of Parrots" (generally taken as Australia from a later name but originally referring to a location south of Africa, possibly Madagascar)

Legacy

A large number of maps were derived from the Shanhai Yudi Quantu, many of them today in Korean or Japanese archives, but their history is generally difficult to reconstruct.

See also 
 Chinese geography
 Kunyu Wanguo Quantu, Matteo Ricci's map
 Cheonhado

References 

17th century in China
Historic maps of the world
17th-century maps and globes